2020 Casting (now Mad Dog 2020 Casting) is a casting agency based in London, England which supplies extras for film shoots. Previously, it was located in Hopgood St, Shepherd's Bush, in West London. 2020 casting merged with Mad Dog Casting in 2017 to form Mad Dog 2020 Casting and is now based in Ealing Studios.

The agency was founded by actor Christopher Villiers and personal trainer Richard Smedley who met on the set of the film First Knight in around 1995. 2020 was "the first agency to take digital photographs of its artistes", and "the first to use text messaging systems to contact our artistes".

Villiers is known for his part in the top rated ITV soap opera, Emmerdale in which he played the role of the solicitor Grayson Sinclair.

2020 Casting has a sister agency, SA19 that is a leading supplier of uniformed supporting artistes to the UK film and television industry.

2020 claims to have 2,600 artistes registered on their books, with a backup database of well over 30,000. They have supplied extras for more than 200 films, including Harry Potter and the Goblet of Fire, Shaun of the Dead and Bridget Jones's Diary.

References
Jones, Chris Guerilla Film Makers Movie Blueprint Continuum International Publishing Group (2003)  Retrieved December 2012

Notes

External links
2020 Official website Retrieved December 2012
2020 at www.theactingwebsite.com Retrieved December 2012

Talent and literary agencies